Norsk Ordbok (Norwegian dictionary) may refer to:

 Norsk Ordbok (Nynorsk)
 Norsk ordbok (Riksmål)